A click tag is a parameter used in HTML5 banner ads. The parameter is a variable that defines the destination URL from the markup code. By using a click tag, the advertiser can easily see and modify the URL without a HTML5 developer. 

The click tag is supported by every major ad server.

The click tag enables the ad serving network to gain metrics such as the amount of clicks and from which sites these clicks have been made. By reading the data gained by the click tag parameter, an advertiser can evaluate how effective the ad campaign has been.

Variations 

There are no industry standards on how to program a click tag. The code for the programming is case-sensitive, but programmers format their capitalization differently so ad serving networks may require clickTAG, ClickTag, clickTag, or any variation of capitalization for that specific variable.

Some ad serving networks may also require the ad's programmer to specify the level or strata the advertisement directs to such as the Google click tag requirements.

Ad serving networks may also require protocol specification by forcing the URL to begin with "http:" as a security measure advised by Adobe. Adobe warns that a malicious website could source the banner and pass a URL that begins with "javascript:" or another pseudo-protocol creating a hole for malicious scripts. This would allow someone access to the site's data, cookies, or can perform actions on behalf of the website where the ad is placed.

Click tags also vary depending on the version of JavaScript used. They are case-sensitive.

Example code
AS2 Standard

on (release) {
    getURL(_root.clickTAG, "_blank");
}

AS2 Google Network

on (release) {       
    if (clickTAG.substr(0, 5) == "http:" || clickTAG.substr(0, 6) == "https:") {
        getURL(clickTAG, "_blank");
    }
}

AS3 Google Network

Link_1.addEventListener(MouseEvent.MOUSE_UP, function(event: MouseEvent): void {
    var sURL: String;
    if ((sURL = root.loaderInfo.parameters.clickTAG)) {
        navigateToURL(new URLRequest(sURL), "_blank"); 
    }
});

See also
 Click identifier (disambiguation)

References 

Online advertising